Nelson McCain Ford (born June 3, 1947 in Wilmington, Delaware) was United States Under Secretary of the Army from 2007 to 2009.

Education 
Nelson M. Ford was educated at Duke University (B.A. in History) and the University of Delaware (M.Ed.).

Career 
In the 1970s, Ford was Executive Secretary of the Health Care Financing Administration and worked in the Office of Management and Budget on health care policy issues.  He later joined Coopers & Lybrand and became a consultant to health care companies.  In the 1990s, he became Chief Operating Officer of the Georgetown University Medical Center.  In 1997, he became President and CEO of Clinipad, a manufacturer of disposable medical products.

Ford joined the United States Department of Defense in 2002 as Deputy Assistant Secretary of Defense (Health Budgets & Financial Policy).  In 2005, he became Principal Deputy Assistant Secretary of the Army (Financial Management and Comptroller), and the next year President of the United States George W. Bush named Ford full Assistant Secretary of the Army (Financial Management and Comptroller).

In 2007, President Bush nominated Ford as United States Under Secretary of the Army.  Ford held this post until 2009.

Ford worked as President & CEO of LMI, a not-for-profit government consulting firm based in McLean, Va, from 2009 until he retired in June 2017.

References

External links
 
 Biography from the Dept. of the Army
 Biography of Nelson M. Ford at LMI

1947 births
American chief operating officers
American nonprofit chief executives
Delaware Republicans
George W. Bush administration personnel
Living people
United States Under Secretaries of the Army
United States Department of Defense officials
Center for Strategic and Budgetary Assessments